Death and the Maiden is a 1990 play by Chilean playwright Ariel Dorfman. The world premiere was staged at the Royal Court Theatre in London on 9 July 1991, directed by Lindsay Posner. It had one reading and one workshop production prior to its world premiere.

Characters 
 Paulina Salas — thirty-eight years old
 Gerardo Escobar — her husband, a lawyer, around forty-five
 Roberto Miranda — a doctor, around fifty

The setting is in the present time, in a country that is likely Chile but could be any nation that has recently transitioned from a long period of dictatorship to a democratic government.

Synopsis 
Paulina Salas is a former political prisoner from an unnamed Latin American country who was raped by her captors, including a sadistic doctor whose face she never saw. The doctor played Schubert's String Quartet No. 14, subtitled Death and the Maiden, during the act of rape, which gives the play its title.

Years later, after the repressive regime has fallen, Paulina lives in an isolated country house with her husband, Gerardo Escobar. When Gerardo returns home from a visit to the president, he gets a flat tire and is helped by a stranger named Dr. Miranda. Later that night, Dr. Miranda returns and Paulina recognizes his voice and mannerism as that of her rapist. She takes him captive in order to put him on trial and extract a confession from him.

Gerardo acts as Dr. Miranda's lawyer and attempts to save his life, but after hearing the full story of Paulina's captivity, he formulates a confession with Dr. Miranda based on the specific details Paulina shared with him. Paulina records the entire confession and has Dr. Miranda sign it. She then sends Gerardo to get Dr. Miranda's car so he can go home. While they are alone for the last time, Paulina accuses Dr. Miranda of being unrepentant and guilty beyond a reasonable doubt. She shares that she purposely altered small details of her story when sharing it with Gerardo, and Dr. Miranda corrected those details in his own confession. Although Dr. Miranda denies this, Paulina is completely convinced of his guilt and prepares to execute him.

The play then skips forward in time, and the audience sees Paulina and Gerardo attending a concert. It is never revealed whether Paulina ultimately killed Dr. Miranda. As the concert orchestra begins to play Schubert's Death and the Maiden, Paulina sees Dr. Miranda across the room cast in a "phantasmagoric" light, and the audience is left to wonder whether he is truly there or only in Paulina's mind.

Productions 
Death and the Maiden had a reading at the Institute for Contemporary Art in London on 30 November 1990:
 Paulina — Penelope Wilton
 Gerardo — Michael Maloney
 Roberto — Jonathan Hyde
 Directed by Peter James

A workshop production was staged and opened in Santiago, Chile, on 10 March 1991:
 Paulina — Maria Elena Duvauchelle
 Gerardo — Hugo Medina
 Roberto — Tito Bustamante
 Directed by Ana Reeves

Death and the Maiden had its world premiere at  The Royal Court Upstairs on 9 July 1991:
 Paulina — Juliet Stevenson
 Gerardo — Bill Paterson
 Roberto — Michael Byrne
 Directed by Lindsay Posner
With the same cast and director, it transferred to the Mainstage at  The Royal Court on 4 November 1991.

The American Broadway premiere of Death and the Maiden opened at the Brooks Atkinson Theatre on 17 March 1992, produced by Roger Berlind, Gladys Nederlander and Frederick Zollo, in association with Thom Mount and Bonnie Timmermann:
 Paulina — Glenn Close
 Gerardo — Richard Dreyfuss
 Roberto — Gene Hackman
 Directed by Mike Nichols

The Australian premiere production of Death and the Maiden took place on 16 December 1992.
 Paulina – Helen Morse
 Gerardo – John Gaden
 Roberto – Frank Gallacher
 Directed by Neil Armfield

The Indian premiere of Death and the Maiden (in Hindi translation by Shalini Vatsa) opened at the India Habitat Centre New Delhi on 17 February 2002, produced by Asmita Theatre.

Death and the Maiden returned to London's West End in 2011 at the Harold Pinter Theatre.
 Paulina – Thandiwe Newton
 Gerardo – Tom Goodman-Hill
 Roberto – Anthony Calf
 Directed by Jeremy Herrin

Death and the Maiden was performed in Iran on 4 November 2015.
 Paulina — Nazanin Khoshnood 
 Gerardo — Jafar Del Del
 Roberto — Mohammad Babaea
 Directed by Mohsen Sadeghian

in 2015 Death and the Maiden was staged as a co-production between the Melbourne Theatre Company (18 July-22 August) and the Sydney Theatre Company (2 September-17 October). Susie Porter played Paulina with Eugene Gilfedder as the man whose voice might be his undoing.

Film adaptation 

In 1994, Roman Polanski directed a film adaptation of the work, starring Sigourney Weaver, Ben Kingsley and Stuart Wilson.

Opera 
An opera based on the play has been composed by Jonas Forssell with the libretto by Ariel Dorfman. The world premiere was staged at the Malmö Opera on 20 September 2008.

Awards and nominations  
 1992 Laurence Olivier Award for Best New Play

References

External links 
 
 

1991 plays
Broadway plays
Chilean plays
Off-Broadway plays
Laurence Olivier Award-winning plays
Plays based on actual events
West End plays
Chilean plays adapted into films